Pseudopostega saltatrix is a moth of the family Opostegidae. It was described by Walsingham, Lord Thomas de Grey, in 1897. It was described from St. Thomas, in the Virgin Islands, but has an extremely wide range, from Cuba to Dominica in the West Indies, south from Belize to Ecuador, French Guiana and Paraguay.

The length of the forewings is 2.1–3.1 mm. In Costa Rica, adults have been collected throughout the year.

References

Opostegidae
Moths described in 1897